All American Boy is the debut solo studio album by American rock musician Rick Derringer, released in October 1973 by Blue Sky Records. "Joy Ride" and "Time Warp" (not to be confused with The Rocky Horror Picture Show song) are instrumentals.

Critical reception
Reviewing for AllMusic, critic Cub Koda wrote of the album "this is simply Rick Derringer's most focused and cohesive album, a marvelous blend of rockers, ballads, and atmospheric instrumentals", adding it was "one of the great albums of the '70s that fell between the cracks."

Release history
In addition to the conventional two channel stereo version the album was also released in a four channel quadraphonic edition on LP record and 8-track tape in 1974. The quad LP release was encoded in the SQ matrix system.

The album was reissued in the UK on the Super Audio CD format in 2018 by Dutton Vocalion. This release is a two albums on one disc compilation which also contains Derringer's 1975 album Spring Fever. The Dutton Vocalion disc contains the complete stereo and quad versions of both albums.

Track listing
All tracks composed by Rick Derringer; except where indicated

Side one
 "Rock and Roll, Hoochie Koo" – 3:43
 "Joy Ride" – instrumental – 1:50
 "Teenage Queen" – 3:31
 "Cheap Tequila" – 2:44
 "Uncomplicated" – 3:40
 "Hold" (Derringer, Patti Smith) – 3:12

Side two
"The Airport Giveth (The Airport Taketh Away)" – 2:49
 "Teenage Love Affair" – 3:20
 "It's Raining" – 2:05
 "Time Warp" – instrumental – 2:53
 "Slide On Over Slinky" – 4:21
 "Jump, Jump, Jump" – 6:00

Personnel
"Rock and Roll Hoochie-Koo"
 Rick Derringer – guitar, bass, tambourine, lead vocals
 Bobby Caldwell – drums
 Carl Hall – backing vocals
 Lani Groves – backing vocals
 Tasha Thomas – backing vocals

"Joy Ride"
 Rick Derringer – guitar, bass
 Bobby Caldwell – drums
 Joe Lala – congas, cowbell

"Teenage Queen"
 Rick Derringer – electric guitar, 12-string acoustic guitar, lead vocals
 Joe Walsh – electric guitar
 Paul Harris – piano
 Kenny Passarelli – bass
 Joe Vitale – drums

"Cheap Tequila"
 Rick Derringer – acoustic guitar, pedal steel guitar, bass, tambourine, lead vocals
 David Bromberg – dobro
 Paul Harris – piano
 Bobby Caldwell – drums
 Carl Hall – backing vocals
 Lani Groves – backing vocals
 Tasha Thomas – backing vocals

"Uncomplicated"
 Rick Derringer – lead guitar, lead vocals
 Joe Walsh – electric guitar
 Kenny Passarelli – bass
 Joe Vitale – drums
 Joe Lala – cowbell

"Hold"
 Rick Derringer – acoustic guitar, bass, lead vocals
 Edgar Winter – piano
 Bobby Caldwell – drums
 Carl Hall – backing vocals
 Lani Groves – backing vocals
 Tasha Thomas – backing vocals

"The Airport Giveth (The Airport Taketh Away)"
 Rick Derringer – guitar, bass, organ, tambourine, lead vocals
 Edgar Winter – piano
 Bobby Caldwell – drums
 Carl Hall – backing vocals
 Lani Groves – backing vocals
 Tasha Thomas – backing vocals

"Teenage Love Affair"
 Rick Derringer – guitar, bass, lead vocals, backing vocals
 Bobby Caldwell – drums

"It's Raining"
 Rick Derringer – guitar, bass, lead vocals
 Jean "Toots" Thielemans – chromatic harmonica
 Paul Harris – piano
 Bobby Caldwell – drums
 Joe Lala – congas

"Time Warp"
 Rick Derringer – acoustic guitar, electric guitar, electric sitar, bass, tambourine, maracas
 Edgar Winter – organ
 Bobby Caldwell – drums
 Joe Lala – congas

"Slide on Over Slinky"
 Rick Derringer – guitar, bass, hair-drum, cowbell, lead vocals
 Edgar Winter – synthesized clavinet
 Bobby Caldwell – drums
 Carl Hall – backing vocals
 Lani Groves – backing vocals
 Tasha Thomas – backing vocals

"Jump, Jump, Jump"
 Rick Derringer – guitar, bass, gong, lead vocals
 Edgar Winter – electric piano, acoustic piano
 Bobby Caldwell – drums

Charts

References

External links

Rick Derringer albums
1973 debut albums
Albums produced by Bill Szymczyk
Albums produced by Rick Derringer
Blue Sky Records albums